Talia Or is an Israeli-born operatic and concert soprano based in Germany. Her repertoire ranges from concert and lied to contemporary music. She is a lecturer on singing at Musikhochschule München.

Early life and education
Born in Jerusalem, Or grew up in Germany from age four, when her family moved to Aachen. Her father was a teacher at the synagogue, and her mother a singer in the opera chorus. She appeared on the stage of Stadttheater Aachen at the age of ten. She studied  at the Musikhochschule Hamburg.

Career
While still a student Or made her debut at Hamburg State Opera as Taumännchen in Humperdinck's Hänsel und Gretel and Papagena in Mozart's Zauberflöte. As a member of the opera studio of La Monnaie in Brussels, she appeared in 2002 as Cherubino in Mozart's Le nozze di Figaro. In Munich she was part of Junges Ensemble of the Bavarian State Opera, and ensemble member at Staatstheater am Gärtnerplatz from 2004 to 2008, singing Pamina in Die Zauberflöte, Gretel in Hänsel und Gretel and Rosina in Rossini's Il Barbiere di Siviglia, among others. Internationally she performed as a guest in Turin, Valencia, Sao Paulo and Tokyo. Her repertoire further includes Marzelline in Beethoven's Fidelio, Rosalinde in Die Fledermaus by Johann Strauss, and Tatjana in Tchaikovsky's Eugene Onegin.

In 2010 she appeared as Lisa in Weinberg's Das Portrait at Bregenzer Festspiele, the opera's Western European premiere. In 2012 she performed as the Voice of a Falcon in Die Frau ohne Schatten by Richard Strauss at La Scala in Milan, directed by Claus Guth and conducted by Semyon Bychkov. She sang at operklosterneuburg opera festival in 2013, portraying Frau Fluth in Nicolai's Die lustigen Weiber von Windsor. Reviewer Lena Dražic of the Wiener Zeitung noted: 

In concert she performed Mahler's Symphony No. 2 with the Israel Philharmonic Orchestra conducted by Zubin Mehta, Mozart's Great Mass in C minor conducted by Andris Nelsons, and Bach's Christmas Oratorio conducted by Peter Schreier for the Maggio Musicale Fiorentino. On 4 June 2016 she was the soprano soloist in three works with five choirs at the choral festival in Lüneburg, singing Poulenc's Gloria, the Requiem "Schwarz vor Augen und es ward Licht" by Harald Weiss, and Bernstein's Symphony No. 3 "Kaddish". On 3 October 2022 she was the soprano soloist in Verdi's Requiem at St. Bonifatius, Wiesbaden, in a version for small ensemble, with Silvia Hauer, Sung Min Song, Johannes Hill and members of Hessisches Staatsorchester conducted by Johannes Schröder.

In 2008 Or recorded the soprano solo for Bach's cantata Wachet auf, ruft uns die Stimme, BWV 140, with the Israel Philharmonic Orchestra conducted by Mehta in a live performance at the Jerusalem Theatre of the ICC International Center in Jerusalem. In 2010 she recorded Weinberg's Three Palms, a setting of Lermontov's Three Palms for soprano and string quartet, Op. 120. A reviewer noted her "heartfelt passion". She recorded two works by Simon Mayr, the dramatic cantata L'Armonia and the Cantata for the Death of Beethoven, with the Simon Mayr Choir and the Ingolstadt Georgian Chamber Orchestra, conducted by Franz Hauk.

Other work
Or is a lecturer of singing at the Musikhochschule München.

References

External links

 
 
 Talia Or operabase.com
 Talia Or (management) mennicken-pr.com
 Talia Or (Soprano) Bach Cantatas Website 2017

Living people
Musicians from Jerusalem
21st-century Israeli women opera singers
21st-century German women opera singers
Hochschule für Musik und Theater Hamburg alumni
Academic staff of the University of Music and Performing Arts Munich
Israeli emigrants to Germany
People from Aachen
21st-century German Jews
21st-century Israeli Jews
Jewish women singers
Jewish opera singers
Year of birth missing (living people)